John Reilly (born 27 August 1943) is a former football goalkeeper who was a member of the Australia national soccer team, representing the nation 35 times during the 1970s; he was in the 1974 FIFA World Cup squad and also represented Victoria.

Career
Reilly learnt his goalkeeping skills while playing with local Aberdeenshire Junior sides Parkvale, in his hometown of Stonehaven, and Inverurie Loco Works, prior to moving to the reserve team of Hibernian. He made only two first appearances in the Scottish Football League before moving to American club Washington Whips in 1968. Reilly moved to Australia in 1970, signing with Melbourne Juventus. After showing immense talent during his debut season he was drafted into the Australia squad for a world tour. His transfer from St George Saints to Melbourne Hakoah in early 1972 was a then record fee for a goalkeeper of $6,000.

Reilly continued to represent Australia and was selected for their 1974 FIFA World Cup squad. He played in all of their three matches at the tournament, against West Germany, East Germany and Chile. Reilly transferred to Fitzroy United Heidelberg United in 1975. He spent two season at Fitzroy before transferring to South Melbourne. Reilly retired from playing in 1980.

After ending his playing career, Reilly became a horse breeder. He has also served on the committees of FFA and FIFA.

References 

1943 births
Living people
People from Stonehaven
Scottish footballers
Australian soccer players
Australia international soccer players
1974 FIFA World Cup players
Hibernian F.C. players
Inverurie Loco Works F.C. players
South Melbourne FC players
North American Soccer League (1968–1984) players
Washington Whips players
Expatriate soccer players in the United States
Scottish Junior Football Association players
Scottish Football League players
Association football goalkeepers
Scottish emigrants to Australia
Scottish expatriate sportspeople in the United States
Scottish expatriate footballers
Footballers from Aberdeenshire